The Central District of Dehloran County is a district (bakhsh) in Dehloran County, Ilam Province, Iran. At the 2006 census, its population was 32,311, in 6,699 families.  The District has one city: Dehloran.  The District has one rural district (dehestan): Anaran Rural District.

References 

Districts of Ilam Province
Dehloran County